
Gmina Pyzdry is an urban-rural gmina (administrative district) in Września County, Greater Poland Voivodeship, in west-central Poland.

The gmina contains part of the protected area called Warta Landscape Park.

Villages
Apart from the town of Pyzdry, Gmina Pyzdry contains the villages and settlements of Baraniec, Benewicze, Białobrzeg, Białobrzeg Ratajski, Ciemierów, Ciemierów-Kolonia, Dłusk, Dolne Grądy, Glinianki, Górne Grądy, Kamień, Kolonia Janowska, Kolonia Lisewo, Królewiny, Kruszyny, Ksawerów, Lisewo, Lisiaki, Łupice, Modlica, Olsz, Pietrzyków, Pietrzyków-Kolonia, Rataje, Ruda Komorska, Tarnowa, Tłoczyzna, Trzcianki, Walga, Wrąbczynek, Wrąbczynkowskie Holendry, Zamość, Zapowiednia, Żdżary and Zimochowiec.

Neighbouring gminas
Gmina Pyzdry is bordered by the gminas of Gizałki, Kołaczkowo, Lądek, Zagórów and Żerków.

References
Polish official population figures 2006

 
Pyzdry